"I Don't Need Your Love" is a song produced and recorded by Albanian-American singer and actress Bleona, released as a single on 6 July 2018.

Background
The single became Bleona's first number one on Billboards Dance Club Songs chart (her second top ten and fourth charted single), reaching the summit in its 16 February 2019 issue.

When Billboard asked her about the song's success and its meaning behind it, Bleona told the magazine "This song means the world to me, as it is a personal story, something that I wrote while I was having a major heartbreak and I had no choice but to put my pain in my music. I believe a lot of girls depend on a guy to give them validation and a lot of guys think a girl cannot succeed without their support, so 'I Don't Need Your Love' sends exactly the type of message that breaks this pattern. I think the phrase, 'guess you thought that I would fall, but damn it, I don't need your love,' pretty much sums it all up."

Track listing

Single

Remixes (Part 1)

Remixes (Part 2)

Charts

Weekly charts

Year-end charts

See also
 List of number-one dance singles of 2019 (U.S.)

References

External links
Official video at YouTube

2018 singles
2018 songs
Bleona songs
Songs about heartache